The Fontaine des Neuf-Canons is a listed fountain in Aix-en-Provence, Bouches-du-Rhône, France.

Location
The fountain is located on the Cours Mirabeau in the center of Aix-en-Provence, France.

History
Prior to the construction of this fountain, a watering hole was used here by shepherds and farmers for their livestock. In 1691, architect Laurent Vallon (1652-1724) designed this fountain. It is covered in moss.

Heritage significance
It has been listed as a "monument historique" since 15 January 1929.

References

Buildings and structures in Aix-en-Provence
Buildings and structures completed in 1691
Fountains in France
Monuments historiques of Aix-en-Provence
1691 establishments in France